This is a list of Academy Award winners and nominees from Russia.

Best Actor in a Leading Role

Best Actor in a Supporting Role

Best Actress in a Supporting Role

Best Director

Best Adapted Screenplay

Best Original Screenplay

Best Story

Best International Feature Film

Best Art Direction

Best Cinematography

Best Documentary Feature

Best Animated Short Film

Best Live Action Short Film

Best Original Score

Best Original Song

Nominations and Winners

Notes

References

Lists of Academy Award winners and nominees by nationality or region
Academy Award winners and nominees
Academy Award winners and nominees
Russian film-related lists